Francesco Bellotti (born 6 August 1979 in Bussolengo) is an Italian former professional road bicycle racer, who last rode for UCI ProTour team .

Major results

2001
 8th GP Palio del Recioto
2003
 6th GP Lugano
 8th Giro della Provincia di reggio Calabria
2004
 2nd Gran Premio Industria e Commercio di Prato
2005
 7th Overall Tour de l'Ain
 7th Tour du Finistère
2006
 2nd Overall Tour de Langkawi
2008
 5th Overall Giro del Trentino
 10th Overall Volta ao Alentejo
2010
 2nd GP Nobili Rubinetterie
 7th Gran Premio Industria e Commercio Artigianato Carnaghese

Grand Tour general classification results timeline

External links 

Italian male cyclists
1979 births
Living people
Cyclists from the Province of Verona